Admiral Lord Clarence Edward Paget  (17 June 1811 – 22 March 1895) was a British naval officer, politician, and sculptor.

Naval career
Born the younger son of the 1st Marquess of Anglesey, Paget in 1827 like many younger sons of nobility entered the Royal Navy as a midshipman on the second-rate ship-of-the-line  and took part in the Battle of Navarino in 1827.

Paget attempted to enter Parliament as a Liberal for Southampton in 1837, but was returned as a member for Sandwich in 1847, retaining the seat until July 1852.

Paget served as secretary to the Master-General of the Ordnance from 1846 to 1853. He commanded the second-rate ship-of-the-line  in the expedition to the Baltic in 1854 during the Crimean War (1854–1856). Again Member of Parliament for Southampton from March 1857, he was appointed Secretary to the Admiralty in June 1859 but accepted the Chiltern Hundreds (i.e., resigned) in March 1866. He was promoted to vice admiral in 1865 and was Commander-in Chief, Mediterranean Fleet from 1866 to 1869.

Paget retired in 1876. He died in 1895 at the age of 83.

Family
In 1852 Paget married Martha Stuart, the youngest daughter of Admiral Sir Robert Waller Otway, Bt.

References

Further reading

External links 
 

|-

|-

1811 births
1895 deaths
Liberal Party (UK) MPs for English constituencies
Knights Grand Cross of the Order of the Bath
UK MPs 1847–1852
UK MPs 1857–1859
UK MPs 1859–1865
UK MPs 1865–1868
Royal Navy admirals
Younger sons of marquesses
Clarence
Members of the Privy Council of the United Kingdom
British military personnel of the Greek War of Independence
Royal Navy personnel of the Crimean War